is a bus company in north area of Nagasaki Prefecture and west area of Saga Prefecture.

Area
Nagasaki Prefecture
Hirado City
Matsuura City
Saikai City (only Saikaibashi-Nishiguchi Bus stop)
Sasebo City
Kitamatsuura District
Minamimatsuura District
Saga Prefecture
Imari City
Takeo City
Ureshino City
Nishimatsuura District

History
1920-02-10 - Saihi Motor was established by Kyotaro Nakamura and some enterprisers in Kitamatsuura Area.

Other links

Saihi Bus

Bus companies of Japan